Obo is a small town in the Kwahu South district in Eastern Ghana.

References

Populated places in the Eastern Region (Ghana)